Chris Eboch is a children's book author currently living in New Mexico.

She is the New Mexico Regional Advisor for the Society of Children's Book Writers and Illustrators and a teacher for the Institute of Children's Literature. She also writes novels for adults under the name "Kris Bock".

She is the sister of screenwriter Douglas J. Eboch (Sweet Home Alabama).

Books
The Well of Sacrifice, a middle grade historical drama set in ninth century Mayan Guatemala
Life among the Maya
Modern Nations of the World: Yemen
Modern Nations of the World: Turkey
Science Measurements; and Science Tools.
Rattled (writing as Kris Bock)
Eyes of Pharaoh
Childhood of Famous Americans: Jesse Owens (fictionalized biography for elementary school children)
Childhood of Famous Americans: Milton Hershey (fictionalized biography for elementary school children)
What We Found (writing as Kris Bock)
Whispers in the Dark (writing as Kris Bock)

Haunted Series
Ghost on the Stairs
Knight in the Shadows
Riverboat Phantom
Ghost Miner's Treasure

References

External links

Author's website (Chris Eboch)
Kris Bock pseudonym website
New Mexico regional SCBWI website

Year of birth missing (living people)
Living people
American children's writers
American women children's writers
Writers from New Mexico
21st-century American women writers
21st-century American writers